Heydarabad (also Romanized as Ḩeydarābād and Haidarābād) is a village in Jolgah Rural District, in the Central District of Jahrom County, Fars Province, Iran. At the 2006 census, its population was 6,726, in 1,449 families.

References 

Populated places in Jahrom County